Dimbula is a village located in the Central Province, Sri Lanka.

See also
List of towns in Central Province, Sri Lanka

References

External links

Populated places in Nuwara Eliya District